is a dam in Kitagawa, Kōchi Prefecture, Japan, completed in 1970. It is located on the Nahari River immediately upstream from the Kuki Dam and further upstream from the Hiranabe Dam.

References

Dams in Kōchi Prefecture
Dams completed in 1970